The 2015–16 Loyola Ramblers men's basketball team represented Loyola University Chicago during the 2015–16 NCAA Division I men's basketball season. The Ramblers, led by fifth year head coach Porter Moser, played their home games at the Joseph J. Gentile Arena and were members of the Missouri Valley Conference. They finished the season 15–17, 7–11 in Missouri Valley play to finish in eighth place. They defeated Bradley in the first round of the Missouri Valley tournament to advance to the quarterfinals where they lost to Wichita State.

Previous season
The Ramblers finished the season 24–13, 8–10 in MVC play to finish in sixth place. They advanced to the semifinals of the Missouri Valley tournament where they lost to Northern Iowa. They were invited to the College Basketball Invitational where they defeated Rider, Oral Roberts, and Seattle to advance to the best-of-three finals series against Louisiana–Monroe. They defeated Louisiana–Monroe 2 games to 0 to become the CBI champions.

Departures

Incoming Transfers

Recruiting

Roster

Schedule

|-
!colspan=9 style="background:#800000; color:#D4AF37;"| Exhibition

|-
!colspan=9 style="background:#800000; color:#D4AF37;"| Non-conference regular season

|-
!colspan=9 style="background:#800000; color:#D4AF37;"| Missouri Valley regular season

|-
!colspan=9 style="background:#800000; color:#D4AF37;"| Missouri Valley tournament

References

Loyola Ramblers men's basketball seasons
Loyola
Loyola Ramblers
Loyola Ramblers